At 6,000 acres (24 km²), North Long Lake is one of the larger lakes in the Brainerd Lakes Area of the U.S. state of Minnesota.

External links
MN DNR Lake Finder results for North Long Lake
CTV.ca - 'Black hole' in Minnesota lake baffles experts

Lakes of Crow Wing County, Minnesota
Lakes of Minnesota